Micropholis garciniifolia is a species of plant in the family Sapotaceae. It is endemic to Puerto Rico, where it is known as caimitillo verde. It is becoming rare due to habitat loss.

References

garciniifolia
Near threatened plants
Plants described in 1891
Endemic flora of Puerto Rico
Taxonomy articles created by Polbot